Raymond Suvigny (21 January 1903 – 26 October 1945) was a French weightlifter. He competed at the 1924 and 1932 Olympics and won a gold medal in 1932.

Suvigny took up weightlifting in 1919 while working at the Paris Métro. In 1924 he showed world-level results, but placed only ninth at the 1924 Summer Olympics due to an injury. He came to prominence in 1926, when he won his first national title and set two unofficial world records. He retired after winning the 1932 Olympic gold medal. During World War II he was kept as a prisoner of war and died in October 1945.

References

External links

1903 births
1945 deaths
Sportspeople from Paris
French male weightlifters
Olympic weightlifters of France
Weightlifters at the 1924 Summer Olympics
Weightlifters at the 1932 Summer Olympics
Olympic gold medalists for France
Olympic medalists in weightlifting
Medalists at the 1932 Summer Olympics
French people who died in prison custody
French prisoners of war in World War II
French military personnel killed in World War II
20th-century French people